Anthony of Padua (Italian: Antonio di Padova) is a 1949 Italian historical drama film directed by Pietro Francisci and starring Aldo Fiorelli, Silvana Pampanini and Carlo Giustini. The film portrays the life of Anthony of Padua (1195–1231).

Cast
 Aldo Fiorelli as Fernando - poi Antonio di Padova 
 Silvana Pampanini as Anita - madre di Fernando 
 Carlo Giustini as Padre di Fernando 
 Alberto Pomerani as Il piccolo Fernando 
  as Conte Vincenzo 
 Luigi Pavese as Don Luigi 
 Ugo Sasso as Il contadino 
 Lola Braccini as Sua madre 
 Nino Pavese as Achille Sartori 
 Piero Pastore as Giano 
 Mario Ferrari as Il giudice Don Alicante 
  as Isabella 
 Dianora Veiga as La lussuriosa 
 Cesare Fantoni as Sultano 
 Guido Notari as Avvocato difensore 
 Valerio Tordi as Don Alvaro 
 Riccardo Mangano as Don Diego 
 Carlo Duse as Capitano delle guardie di Ezzelina 
  as Avvocato accusatore 
  as Il buffone di Ezzelino 
  as Frate Bernardo 
 Armando Guarnieri as Il sicario di Ezzelino 
 Sergio Fantoni as Un cavaliere 
 Paola Dalgas as Moglie del contadino 
 Giovanni Onorato as Altro avvocato difensore  
 Aldo Fabrizi as Ezzelino Da Romano  
 Leopoldo Marchionni 
William Murray
Raffaele Saitto
Felice Minotti

References

Bibliography 
 Moliterno, Gino. The A to Z of Italian Cinema. Scarecrow Press, 2009.

External links 
 

1949 films
Italian historical drama films
1940s historical drama films
1940s Italian-language films
Films directed by Pietro Francisci
Films set in Lisbon
Films set in Italy
Films set in the 12th century
Films set in the 13th century
Italian black-and-white films
1949 drama films
1940s Italian films